The Japan Council of International Schools (JCIS) is an association of international schools in Japan. All member schools provide education in English. The smallest JCIS member school has fewer than 100 students and the largest has more than 1,500.

Heads of JCIS schools communicate on both a day-to-day basis about matters of common interest. Topics range from reviews of service providers and employment legislation to dealing with pandemics (bird flu, swine influenza) and natural disasters. Regular meetings are held for heads and curriculum coordinators at JCIS member schools throughout the year. Schools also the costs of visiting speakers or performers. The council also offers subsidies to promote collaborative professional development within the JCIS community.

In addition, council members often collaborate on projects, such as coordinating volunteer efforts  after the 2011 Tōhoku earthquake and tsunami and publishing a book of teaching activities for Japanese classes in 1997.

History
Since 1872, schools offering an education in English and serving the expatriate community have existed in Japan. Four current JCIS member schools can trace their origins to before the First World War. The number of schools burgeoned in the 1950s and 1960s. When school representatives met for the first time in October 1965, they discovered that they shared many of the same problems.

The Japanese Council of Overseas Schools (JCOS) was established in 1972. At first, membership was only open to East Asia Regional Council of Overseas Schools (EARCOS) in Japan. In 1982, membership was widened to include any school that offered its curriculum in English. In 1987, the name was changed to the Japan Council of International Schools, or JCIS, to mirror the European Council of International Schools (ECIS).

Member schools
The following schools are members of the Council:

 American School in Japan
 Aoba-Japan International School
 The British School in Tokyo
 Canadian Academy
 Canadian International School
 Christian Academy in Japan
 Columbia International School
 Fukuoka International School
 Hiroshima International School
 Hokkaido International School
 International School of the Sacred Heart
 K. International School Tokyo
 Kyoto International School
 Marist Brothers International School
 The Montessori School of Tokyo
 Nagoya International School
 New International School
 Nishimachi International School
 Osaka International School
 Osaka YMCA International School
 Saint Maur International School
 St. Mary's International School
 St. Michael's International School
 Seisen International School
 Tohoku International School
 Tokyo International School
 Tsukuba International School
 Yokohama International School

Statement on Child Protection 
In accordance with the United Nations Convention on the Rights of the Child (Articles 19 and 34) the Japan Council of International Schools acknowledges the duty of care to safeguard and promote the welfare of children. We are committed to ensuring safeguarding practice reflecting statutory responsibilities, government guidance, and compliance with best practice and accrediting body requirements.

Each JCIS school has the following:

 Staff Code of Conduct
 Effective recruiting practice with a specific attention to child protection
 Reporting Guidelines
 Ongoing child safety education for school community
 Published child protection policy to both internal and external audiences

Notes

External links

 
 Map of JCIS member schools

Associations of schools
International school associations
International schools in Japan